Vivian Wang (b. 1945, Shanghai, China) is an artist known for her glass sculptures. Wang began her career as a fashion designer in New York City. She transitioned to sculpture after seeing the work of Akio Takamori. Her work is in the Barry Art Museum in Norfolk, Virginia, the Fort Wayne Museum of Art, and the Imagine Museum in St. Petersburg, Florida,

Her work, Shanghai Tiger, was acquired by the Smithsonian American Art Museum as part of the Renwick Gallery's 50th Anniversary Campaign.

References

1945 births
Living people
Artists from Shanghai
20th-century American women artists
20th-century American artists
21st-century American women artists
21st-century American artists
American glass artists
Women glass artists
Chinese emigrants to the United States